Ralph Black (born October 6, 1963 in Glasgow) is a retired Scottish-American soccer defender who spent most of his career in indoor soccer.

Indoor soccer

MISL
Black began his career with the Denver Avalanche of Major Indoor Soccer League (MISL).  The Avalanche folded at the end of 1981-1982 season.  He then moved to the Baltimore Blast.  However, in 1984, MISL granted a franchise in Washington State, known as the Tacoma Stars.  Black established himself as a mainstay in the Stars defense.  He spent at least the 1989-1990 season with the San Diego Sockers.  However, he was back in Tacoma for the 1991-1992 season.  The Stars and MISL folded in 1992.  He finished his career in the MISL ranked sixth on the all time games played list with 442 games.

NPSL
After the MISL folded, Black moved to the Buffalo Blizzard of the National Professional Soccer League (NPSL) for two seasons, 1992-1994.

CISL
However, in 1993 Black moved back west to sign with the expansion Anaheim Splash of the newly established Continental Indoor Soccer League (CISL).  In 1994, he was the CISL Defender of the Year as well as a member of the All-CISL First Team.  In 1995, he moved back to Pacific Northwest to play for the Seattle SeaDogs.   He was named to the 1995 CISL All Star game, but was unable to play due to an injury.  However, in 1996, he moved to the Portland Pride.  He played that and the 1997 season with the Pride.

PSA/WISL

At the end of the 1997 season, the CISL folded and the Pride, under new ownership, changed its name to the Portland Pythons.  The Pythons then helped found the Premier Soccer Alliance (PSA).  The PSA played one season, 1998, before changin its name to the World Indoor Soccer League (WISL).  Black remained with the team through all these changes, becoming the Pythons’ head coach for 1998 and 1999.  At the end of the 1999 season, the Pythons folded when a rumoured move to Tacoma, Washington fell through.

Outdoor soccer
Black was on the roster of the San Jose Earthquakes of the Western Soccer League during the 1988 season.  In 1992, between the folding of the Tacoma Stars and his arrival in Buffalo to play for the Blizzard, Black spent a season with the Tampa Bay Rowdies of the American Professional Soccer League (APSL).

Coaching
After retiring as a player, Black went on to be head coach of the Portland Pythons. He then moved into youth coaching and is currently the Boys' Director of Coaching for the Seattle United soccer club.

References

External links
 Washington Premier F.C. profile
 MISL stats

1963 births
Living people
American Professional Soccer League players
American soccer coaches
American soccer players
Anaheim Splash players
Baltimore Blast (1980–1992) players
Buffalo Blizzard players
Continental Indoor Soccer League players
Denver Avalanche players
Seattle Storm (soccer) players
Association football defenders
Major Indoor Soccer League (1978–1992) players
National Professional Soccer League (1984–2001) players
Portland Pride players
Portland Pythons players
Premier Soccer Alliance coaches
Premier Soccer Alliance players
San Diego Sockers (original MISL) players
San Jose Earthquakes (1974–1988) players
Seattle SeaDogs players
Footballers from Glasgow
Tacoma Stars players
Tampa Bay Rowdies (1975–1993) players
Western Soccer Alliance players
World Indoor Soccer League coaches
World Indoor Soccer League players
United States men's youth international soccer players